St John Ambulance Cadets may refer to:

 St John Ambulance Cadets (England) – The youth division of St John Ambulance in England
 St John Ambulance Australia Cadets – The youth division of St John Ambulance in Australia
 St John Youth New Zealand – The youth division of St John Ambulance in New Zealand.

St John Ambulance